Robert Thomas Greenfield IV (also known as Robby Greenfield) is an American businessman, activist, philanthropist and former college athlete. He is the founder of the financial technology company Umoja Labs, formerly known as Emerging Impact, and serving as the former Head of Social Impact of ConsenSys, co-founding its philanthropic arm, ConsenSys Social Impact.

Early life 
Greenfield is from Atlanta, GA. He attended a four-year prep school at The Westminster Schools in Atlanta, GA, where he played soccer and participated in track and field. As a soccer player, he won the 2011 GHSA State Championships. In Track & Field, Greenfield participated in the 100 meter, 4x100 meter, and triple jump events, and won a State Championship as a sophomore .

Education 
Greenfield attended the University of Michigan and played on its varsity soccer team.  He graduated in 2015 with a degree in industrial engineering. While studying at the University of Michigan, Greenfield was a student activist, serving as the treasurer of the Black Student Union and a leader of the 2013 social media awareness campaign Being Black at Michigan (#BBUM).

Greenfield also earned an MBA from Goizueta Business School at Emory University in 2020.

Career 
Greenfield’s career in the blockchain industry began when he developed an online cryptocurrency trading firm as a junior at the University of Michigan.  He went on to co-found the app development company Nomsy, which developed and published a food discovery app with dietary information.

After graduating, Greenfield worked at companies such as Cisco, Amazon and Goldman Sachs.

Greenfield was eventually appointed Head of Social Impact at ConsenSys. He co-founded ConsenSys Social Impact, which leveraged blockchain technology and education to address the needs of underprivileged individuals globally.

As a blockchain community advocate, Greenfield helped launch scholarship programs, including Black Girls CODE’s inaugural blockchain program.

In 2018, Greenfield was appointed as the Chief of Technology for the Blockchain for Social Impact Coalition after ConsenSys helped launch the initiative.

In 2020, Greenfield returned to Emory University to teach at the university’s “Peer to Peer Master Class” sessions.

In 2020, he founded Emerging Impact (now known as Umoja Labs) a fintech company developing blockchain products for areas with limited access through fiat and mobile money.  Its first product was Umoja, an open developer banking platform for mobile money. Emerging Impact has partnered with major NGOs such as Hope for Haiti, Care International, and the Celo Foundation to support digital humanitarian aid programs around the world. The company was named a winner of Inclusive Fintech 50’s 2022 cohort for their work in digitizing financial services for underserved communities.

References 

Living people
Activists from Atlanta
African-American activists
21st-century businesspeople
African-American track and field athletes
Year of birth missing (living people)